Harriette Smythies, (1813–1883, aged 69), was an English novelist and poet. She was a prolific writer of sensation novels, publishing 20 books between 1838 and 1875.

Life 
Smythies was born Harriet Maria Gordon in 1813 to an aristocratic military family in Margate, Kent. Her parents were Jane Gordon (née Halliday) and Edward Lesmoir Gordon, a Sergeant-at-Arms. Smythie had four siblings, including a brother, Edward, who was Sergeant-at-Arms at the coronation of Queen Victoria in 1838.

Smythies married Reverend William Yorick Smythies (1816-1910).

Smythies works were published primarily by Richard Bentley, Thomas Cautley Newby, and Hurst and Blackett, sometimes under the name "Mrs. Gordon Smythies." Many of her novels involve themes of love and marriage.

Bibliography

Poetry 

 The Bride of Siena (poem, 1835)

Novels 

 Fitzherbert: or, Lovers and Fortune-Hunters (1838)
 Cousin Geoffrey: The Old Bachelor, A Novel (1840)
 The Marrying Man (1841)
 The Matchmaker: A Novel (1842)
 The Jilt: A Novel (1844)
 Breach of Promise (1845)
 The Life of a Beauty: A Novel (1846)
 A Warning to Wives: or, The Platonic Lover (1847)
 Courtship and Wedlock (1850)
 The Bride Elect (1852)
 Married for Love (1857)
 A Lover's Quarrel: or, The County Ball (1858)
 Hope Evermore: or, Something to Do (1860)
 Alone in the World: A Novel (1861)
 The Daily Governess: or, Self Dependence (1861)
 True to the Last: A Novel (1864)
 A Faithful Woman (1865)
 Idols of Clay: A Novel (1867)
 Acquitted: A Novel (1870)
 Eva's Fortune (1875)

References

1813 births
1883 deaths
People from Margate
Victorian women writers
19th-century English women writers
19th-century English novelists